Events from the year 1996 in South Korea.

Incumbents
President: Kim Young-sam 
Prime Minister: Lee Soo-sung

Events

September 18:1996 Gangneung submarine infiltration incident

Births

January 
 January 16 — Jennie, member of Blackpink
 January 26 — I.M, member of Monsta X

February 
 February 1 — Do-young, member of NCT (band)
 February 9 - Chungha, singer, member of I.O.I
 February 27 — Ten, member of NCT (band)

March

April

May 
 May 27 — Kim Jae-hwan, member of Wanna One

June 
 June 4 — Yu So-jeong, handball player
 June 10 — Jun, member of Seventeen
 June 15 — Hoshi, member of Seventeen
 June 19 — Chan-mi, member of AOA (group)

July 
 July 1 — Choi Mi-sun, archer
 July 10 — Moon Ga-young, actress
 July 17 — Won-woo, member of Seventeen
 July 19 — Oh Ha-young, member of Apink

August 
 August 5 - Cho Seung-youn, member of X1 and UNIQ
 August 12 – Choi Yu-jun, member of Kep1er
 August 19 — Yerin, actress and member of GFriend
 August 28 - Kim Se-jeong, singer and actress, member of I.O.I

September 
September 3 — Joy, member of Red Velvet
 September 17 — Young-jae, member of Got7
 September 23 — Lee Hi, singer

October 
 October 15 — Zelo, member of B.A.P
 October 22 — B.I, member of iKON

November 
November 1 — Jung-yeon, member of Twice
 November 9 — Momo Hirai, member of Twice
 November 22 — Woozi, member of Seventeen

December 
 December 10 — Kang Daniel, member of Wanna One
 December 29 — Sana, member of Twice

Deaths

 January 1 - Kim Wol-ha, singer (b. 1918)
 January 6 - Kim Kwang-seok, folk rock singer (b. 1964)
 October 1 - Choe Deok-geun, consular official (b. 1951/1952)
 November 2 - Kang Hyo-shil, film and stage actress (b. 1932)
 Han Hong-ki, footballer (b. 1924)

See also
List of South Korean films of 1996
Years in Japan
Years in North Korea

References

 
South Korea
Years of the 20th century in South Korea
1990s in South Korea
South Korea